Abana is a town in the Kastamonu Province in the Black Sea region of Turkey. It is in the north-eastern part of the province, on the shore of the Black Sea. It is the seat of Abana District. Its population is 3,317 (2021).

History
Abana is the oldest town of Kastamonu, once a part of Paphlagonia, the town was ruled by the Danishmends, the Seljuk Turks, the Jandarid dynasty, and finally Ottomans. It was made a district of the Kastamonu province in 1945.

Transportion
Abana can be easily reached from Kastamonu via Devrakani and Bozkurt.

Gallery

References

Populated places in Kastamonu Province
Fishing communities in Turkey
Abana District
Towns in Turkey